Alston James Weller May was an  Anglican bishop in the first half of the 20th century. 

He was born in 1869  and educated at Leeds Grammar School and Oriel College, Oxford . After a period of study at Ripon College Cuddesdon he was  ordained in  1894. His first posts were  curacies at All Souls, Leeds and St Mark, Portsmouth following which he was  Curate in Charge of  St Peter's, Chertsey. In 1914 he was appointed the 2nd Bishop of Northern Rhodesia, a post he held until his death on 17 July 1940.

Notes

1869 births
People educated at Leeds Grammar School
Alumni of Oriel College, Oxford
Alumni of Ripon College Cuddesdon
20th-century Anglican bishops in Africa
Anglican bishops of Northern Rhodesia
1940 deaths